Joan May Woodland (8 May 1921 – 13 November 2013) was an Australian track and field athlete who competed in the 1938 British Empire Games. Woodland was born in Nottingham, England in May 1921. During World War II, Woodland served in the Australian armed forces. She was a member of the Australian team in the 1938 Empire Games, which won the gold medal in the 220-110-220-110 yards relay competition. In the 100 yards competition she finished fifth. She died in November 2013 at the age of 92.

References

External links 
Athletics Podium: Joan Woodland
 

1921 births
2013 deaths
Athletes (track and field) at the 1938 British Empire Games
Australian female sprinters
Commonwealth Games gold medallists for Australia
Commonwealth Games medallists in athletics
20th-century Australian women
21st-century Australian women
Medallists at the 1938 British Empire Games